The Tunisian Air Force is one of the branches of the Tunisian Armed Forces.

History
The Tunisian Air Force was established in 1959, three years after Tunisia regained its independence from France.  It took deliveries of its first aircraft, eight Saab 91 Safirs, in 1960, later to be complemented by further Saab 91 Safirs. The Tunisian Air Force entered the jet age in 1965 with the purchase of 8 MB326-B's and then 5 MB326-LT's. In 1969, the country received 15 ex-USAF F-86F Sabres. Between 1974 and 1978 12 SF.260 Warriors and 9 SF.260Cs were delivered for basic training. In 1977–78, eight MB.326KT's were supplied for light attack duties. In 1981, Tunisia ordered 12 F-5's (8 F-5E and 4 F-5F); deliveries took place in 1984–85. Tunisia added 5 ex-USAF F-5E's from the Alconbury Aggressor Squadron in 1989. In 1985 Tunisia ordered two C130-H Herculeses. In 1995, a major Czech order was placed, with 12 Aero L-59 armed trainers and 3 Let L-410UVP transports ordered. In 1997, five surplus C-130B's were delivered from the USA. Tunisia had two C-130J-30s on order for delivery in 2013 and 2014. Tunisia purchased a 12 UH-60M.

Tunisia's four main bases are Bizerte/Sidi Ahmed, Gafsa, Bizerte/La Karouba, and Sfax.

Organization
The order of battle of the Tunisian Air force is as below:

Tunis-Laouina
No. 12 Squadron Transport squadron, Let L-410 Turbolet

Bizerte-Sidi Ahmed
No. 11 Squadron Jet trainer squadron, Aermacchi MB-326
No. 15 Squadron Fighter squadron, Northrop F-5 Tiger
No. 21 Squadron Transport squadron, C-130 Hercules, G-222

Bizerte-La Karouba
No. 31 Squadron Helicopter squadron, Bell 205, UH-1 Iroquois
No. 32 Squadron Helicopter squadron, Alouette II, Ecureuil
No. 33 Squadron Helicopter squadron
No. 36 Squadron Helicopter squadron

Sfax-Thyna
No. 13 Squadron Light utility and liaison squadron, flying SF-260s
No. 14 Squadron Light utility and liaison squadron, flying SF-260s
No. ? Squadron Helicopter squadron

Gafsa
No. 16 Squadron Jet trainer squadron, flying L-59s
No. 34 Squadron

Aircraft

Current inventory

References

Sources

 World Aircraft Information Files. Brightstar Publishing, London. File 337 Sheet 03

Air forces by country
Military of Tunisia
Military units and formations established in 1959
1959 establishments in Tunisia
Military aviation in Africa